This is a list of electoral results for the Geelong Province in Victorian state elections.

Members for Geelong Province

Election results

Elections in the 2000s

Elections in the 1990s

Elections in the 1980s

 Two party preferred vote was estimated.

Elections in the 1970s

References

Victoria (Australia) state electoral results by district